George Frederick May (7 September 1891 – 1 February 1920) was an Australian rules footballer who played with Richmond in the Victorian Football League (VFL).

Notes

External links 

1891 births
1920 deaths
Australian rules footballers from Victoria (Australia)
Richmond Football Club players